Thiruvalangadu is a town in Kuthalam taluk of Nagapattinam district. It is situated on the Mayiladuthurai-Kumbakonam road. It is situated between Aduthurai and Kuthalam at a distance of about 25 kilometres from Kumbakonam and 13 kilometres from Mayiladuthurai. 

The samadhi of Advaita scholar Appayya Dikshitar is situated on the banks of the Kaveri River adjoining Bhaskararajapuram. 

Thiruvalangadu is situated in Bank of Cavery.

References 

Cities and towns in Mayiladuthurai district